Masiello is a surname originating in Italy. Notable people with the surname include:

Andrea Masiello (born 1986), Italian soccer player
Anthony Masiello, Buffalo, New York, politician
Luciano Masiello (born 1952), Italian-born English and Irish soccer player
Salvatore Masiello (born 1982), Italian soccer player
Wendy M. Masiello, United States Air Force officer

Italian-language surnames